was a Japanese sprinter. He competed in the men's 100 metres, the men's 200 metres, and the men's 4x100 metres relay at the 1956 Summer Olympics.

References

External links
 

1934 births
2010 deaths
Place of birth missing
Japanese male sprinters
Olympic male sprinters
Olympic athletes of Japan
Athletes (track and field) at the 1956 Summer Olympics
Asian Games silver medalists for Japan
Asian Games medalists in athletics (track and field)
Athletes (track and field) at the 1958 Asian Games
Medalists at the 1958 Asian Games
Japan Championships in Athletics winners
20th-century Japanese people